The Wicomico County Sheriff's Office (WCSO) is the primary law enforcement agency servicing Wicomico County, Maryland.  The WCSO was established in 1867 and is responsible for the protection of life and property, enforcing orders of the court, and maintaining the detention facility. 

The current sheriff is Mike A. Lewis. Lewis has attracted national news attention for stating that he will not enforce state gun bans, and proclaiming Wicomico County a "Second Amendment sanctuary". He is a "Sheriff Fellow" of the Claremont Institute.

Organization 
The agency is divided into two bureaus with many divisions:

Special Operations Bureau
 Budget and Finance Division
 Internal Affairs Division
 Administrative Hearings Section
 Human Resources Division
 Sheriff's Emergency Response Team
 Polygraph/VSA Section
 Administrative Resources Division
 Special Investigations Division
 Field Operations Bureau
 Road Patrol Division
 Judicial Protection Division
 School Resource Division

Sheriffs of Wicomico County 
Since 1867, there have been 41 elected sheriffs.

See also 

 List of law enforcement agencies in Maryland

References

External links
Wicomico County Sheriff's Office homepage
Wicomico County government official website

Sheriff's Office
Sheriffs' offices of Maryland
1867 establishments in Maryland